Jordan Nagai (born February 5, 2000) is an American student and former child voice actor. He is best known for his voice role as Russell in Up.

Career
Jordan's older brother Hunter originally auditioned for Russell in Up. Director Pete Docter has said, "As soon as Jordan's voice came on we started smiling because he is appealing and innocent and cute and different from what I was initially thinking." About four hundred children had shown up for the auditions, but Nagai stood out because he wouldn't stop talking the whole time. Nevertheless, he was sometimes very shy, and Docter found it difficult getting him to recite all of his lines. Nagai's character in Up is the first Asian American figure in a movie by Pixar.

He also lent his voice to an episode of The Simpsons called "O Brother, Where Bart Thou?" as the voice of Charlie, an orphan who befriends Bart in his quest for a baby brother. The program aired on December 13, 2009. Nagai has not acted in anything since; instead, opting to pursue a career in biology and healthcare management.

Personal life
Nagai has studied judo since the age of 5, and in 2017, at the age of 17, he achieved a Black Belt.

He attends Washington University in St. Louis and was in the Class of 2022.

Filmography

Films
 Up (2009) – Russell (voice)
 Dug's Special Mission (2009) – Russell (voice)

Television
 Schoolhouse Rock!: Earth – Additional Voices (voice)
 The Simpsons (Episode: "O Brother, Where Bart Thou?") – Charlie (voice)
 Dug Days (Episode: "Science") - Russell (voice; archive recordings)

Video games
 Up (2009) – Russell (voice)

Awards and nominations
2010 Breakout Performance Award, from the East West Players

References

External links
 

2000 births
Living people
American male judoka
American film actors of Asian descent
American male actors of Japanese descent
American male child actors
American male film actors
American male television actors
American male voice actors
American people of Japanese descent
Male actors from Los Angeles
21st-century American male actors
Washington University in St. Louis alumni